Brick Romanesque is an architectural style and chronological phase of architectural history. The term described Romanesque buildings built of brick; like the subsequent Brick Gothic, it is geographically limited to Northern Germany and the Baltic region. Structures in other regions are not described as Brick Romanesque but as "Romanesque brick-built church" or similar terms.

In comparison to Brick Gothic, Brick Romanesque is a less established and less frequently used term. On the one hand, this is caused by the fact that the Baltic region was only beginning to develop its own stylistic identity during the Romanesque period, on the other by the relatively low number of surviving buildings. Many of the major Brick Gothic edifices had Brick Romanesque predecessors, remains of which are often still visible. Nearly all preserved buildings are churches. The buildings contrast with earlier stone-built churches (Fieldstone churches or Feldsteinkirchen), which were constructed of glacial erratics and rubble.  Such rounded stones limit the potential size of a building; the material and technique do not permit the construction of structures larger than a village church for static reasons. Monumental constructions only became possible through the growing use and perfection of brick building.

Import of technique and style  
Already in the antique Roman Empire huge brick buildings had been erected north of the Alps, but present-day Denmark and present-day northern Germany east of Elbe River never had been part of that empire, and west of the Elbe its rule had been too short to build more than some military camps. Even in the northern Roman provinces, the techniques of building in brick were forgotten with the decay of the empire.

But in Langobardia Major, northern Italy, there was a continuity of building in bricks from late Antiquity to early Middle Ages. In Early Lombard Romanesque style, technique and shapes, later on, typical for the Baltic Sea were already completely developed. During the 12th century, Northern Germany and Denmark, at that time the major power of North Sea and Baltic Sea, imported the techniques and many elements of style from the Padan Region.

St. John's Church (Sankt-Johannis-Kirche) in Oldenburg (Holstein) is considered to be the oldest brick church in Northern Europe. The first monumental churches were Ratzeburg cathedral and Lübeck Cathedral, both begun shortly after 1160 under Henry the Lion. Lübeck Cathedral was later converted into a Gothic hall church (1266 to 1335). Jerichow Abbey with its convent church of which construction started in 1148 played an influential role for the brick architecture in the Margraviate of Brandenburg. For Scandinavia, the stylistically independent Roskilde Cathedral, started in the 1170s and used as the burial church for Danish monarchs, is of special importance. The last flourish and the transition to the Gothic style is marked by the Cistercian Lehnin Abbey in the Margraviate of Brandenburg.

Denmark

Germany

West of Weser River

Between Weser and Elbe

East of Elbe River

Poland

Sweden

Bibliography 
 Wolf Karge: Romanische Kirchen im Ostseeraum. Rostock, Hinstorff  1996.

References

.02
.
Romanesque architecture